is a district located in Fukuoka Prefecture, Japan.

As of 2003, the district has an estimated population of 59,006 and a density of 310.97 persons per km2.

Towns and villages
Kotake
Kurate

Merger
On February 11, 2006 the towns of Miyata and Wakamiya merged to form the new city of Miyawaka.

Districts in Fukuoka Prefecture